The 1966 Meistaradeildin was a season of the Faroe Islands Premier League, the top-level association football league in the Faroe Islands. It was contested by five teams, with KÍ Klaksvík winning the championship.

League table

Results

References
RSSSF

Meistaradeildin seasons
Faroe
Faroe